Mamadou Samba Bah (born 13 May 1995) is a Guinean judoka who competes in the under 73kg category.

Selected to compete at the delayed 2020 Summer Olympics in Tokyo, he was drawn in his first match against Tsend-Ochiryn Tsogtbaatar who would go on and win the bronze medal for Mongolia. As a Guinean competitor he had to be granted special dispensation to compete because he missed the official weigh-in after the Guinean federation initially pulled their athletes from the Games over fears around the COVID-19 pandemic, before rescinding that decision after the games had started.

References

1995 births
Living people
Guinean male judoka
Olympic judoka of Guinea
Judoka at the 2020 Summer Olympics